Oulunkylän Kiekko-Kerho (abbreviated OKK) is a Finnish ice hockey team based at Malmin jäähalli (capacity 650), Helsinki. The team was established in 1973.

External links

Ice hockey teams in Finland
Sports clubs in Helsinki